Ben 10 (retroactively known as Classic Ben 10) is an American animated series created by Man of Action. It is produced by Cartoon Network Studios and Distributed By Warner Bros. Domestic Television. The series is about a 10-year-old boy named Ben Tennyson who gets a watch-style alien device called the "Omnitrix". Attached to his wrist, it allows him to transform into 10 different alien creatures with different abilities, allowing him to fight evil from Earth and space with his cousin Gwen and grandfather Max. The series first aired on Cartoon Network as a sneak peek on December 27, 2005, as part of "Sneak Peek Week", airing alongside other shows, including My Gym Partner's a Monkey, Robotboy, and Zixx. The show later began airing on January 13, 2006, and ended on April 15, 2008.

The series gradually became popular and was nominated for two Emmy Awards, winning one for "Outstanding Individual Achievement in Animation". The show would go on to spawn a franchise. Ben 10 was succeeded by Ben 10: Alien Force, Ben 10: Ultimate Alien, and Ben 10: Omniverse. A reboot of the series premiered in 2016.

Premise
The series centers around Ben Tennyson (Tara Strong), a ten-year-old boy on a cross-country summer vacation, with his cousin Gwen (Meagan Smith) and their grandfather Max (Paul Eiding). On their first night camping in their grandfather's RV affectionately named the "Rustbucket," Ben finds an alien pod with a mysterious watch-style device named the Omnitrix. The device then permanently attaches itself to his wrist giving him the ability to transform into a variety of alien life-forms each with its own unique skills and powers. With his newfound superpowers Ben has to learn the responsibilities of being a hero. During their vacation, the Tennysons are attacked by various enemies ranging from space aliens to supernatural entities.

Characters

Benjamin Kirby "Ben" Tennyson: 
Ben is a cocky, immature boy, who is not above enjoying attention and enjoys making jokes even during fights. Though his immaturity makes a bad impression on some people, Ben is good-hearted, noble and loyal, and his actions are motivated above all by a strong and sincere will to help and save others in need. He will stop at nothing to protect his family or anyone in danger whether human or alien. Ben proves to be resourceful, intelligent (Ben has been known to have an eidetic memory), shrewd and cunning when needed, which saved him from many situations, especially when the Omnitrix cannot activate or doesn't provide him with the alien he originally wanted.

Gwendolyn "Gwen" Tennyson: 
Gwen is Ben's cousin and is depicted as a kind and intelligent girl, very skilled with computers and possessing a level of martial arts skills. She is also very independent but is very organized, sometimes to the point of compulsive, but can be a light-hearted schemer and immature as Ben. Overall, her most notable skill is her innate, if latent, ability at magic, first shown in "Tough Luck" when  She was able to use Hex's staff, which can only be used by a master magician, to defeat Charmcaster. She later obtains Charmcaster's spellbook in "Change of Face" and begins improving her magic.

Grandpa Maxwell "Max" Tennyson: 
Ben and Gwen's grandfather, who takes the two on a cross-country road trip for summer vacation. In "Truth" Max reveals he was a part of the Plumber's an intergalactic police force, and handled many extraterrestrial encounters in the past. His history as a plumber has given him knowledge, training, and equipment for fighting aliens as well as an unconventional taste in food, much to the dismay of his grandchildren. In "The Visitor," an old alien acquaintance of Max's called Xylene reveals that Max was the intended recipient of the Omnitrix.

Main villains
Vilgax – A Chimera Sui Generis warlord regarded as one of the most feared aliens in the galaxy, who stops at nothing to take the Omnitrix, which he wishes to use in order to create a transforming super army. In the past, Vilgax was an enemy of Max. Vilgax was injured and remained in a regeneration chamber in the first season, but when completely healed, he was cybernetically enhanced, giving him colossal size, strength and durability that made him a match for every alien Ben could access at that time, therefore becoming the boy's archenemy. Vilgax was the main antagonist of the first season, and was a recurring antagonist in the following seasons.
Sixsix – A Sotoraggian bounty hunter
Kraab – A Piscciss Premann bounty hunter
Kevin Ethan Levin – An 11-year-old delinquent sociopath with a mutant power that allows him to absorb energy. He uses the ability to commit crimes to benefit himself, never caring if it hurts anyone. He originally wanted to team up with Ben to become unstoppable, but after Ben refuses the offer, he absorbs power from the Omnitrix instead. He uses this to frame Ben for robberies using the alien forms, but the constant changes makes his DNA unstable and he eventually becomes a combination of all ten of the alien forms. Becoming a monster makes him hate Ben more than ever, as he blames him for his new form, and he swears revenge, becoming Ben's secondary archenemy and foil: "Kevin 11". Kevin is a minor antagonist in the first season, the main antagonist of the second season and a minor antagonist in the fourth season.
Zs'Skayr – An Ectonurite high king whose rule over the Anur star system saw an opportunity to expand when he learned of the Omnitrix from one of Vilgax's crash-landed data probes. Searching the galaxy, he tried to sample Florana DNA into the Omnitrix but ended up having his own DNA sampled along with it, becoming the genetic donor of Ghostfreak. His powers include invisibility, intangibility, possession, tentacles, energy beam projection, telekinesis and firing energy beams from his hands. He was a minor antagonist in the second season and the main antagonist of the third season.
Doctor Viktor - An alien resembling Frankenstein's monster who is Zs'Skayr's second in command and oversees his master's plan during Season 3. While trying to stop Ben from interfering with their plan, Viktor accidentally opens a portal to the Null Void and is sucked in.
The Yelnodooshi - A werewolf-like alien who serves Zs'Skayr and gathers satellite equipment for his master's plan. When the Tennyson's interference causes the satellite equipment gather to explode, the Velnodooshi is caught in the blast.
The Mummy - A mummy-like alien who serves Zy'Skayr, gathering a dangerous energy crystal with mutagenic properties called Corrodium. When Viktor opens a portal to the Null Void, the Mummy is sucked in along with him.
The Forever Knights – A secret British paramilitary organization formed during the Middle Ages and evolved into an international syndicate that first came to the United States in the 1920s. 
Driscoll / Forever King – A former Plumber kicked out in disgrace after being caught stealing technologies from alien criminals for personal gain, who joined the Forever Knights and eventually became their leader with the goal of achieving world domination. After learning of the Plumbers' secret "sub-energy" weapon the Forever King assembles the Negative 10, a team of the Tennysons' human enemies, to steal it to achieve his goal. He was the main antagonist of season four.
Enoch – One of the leaders of the Forever Knights, though he mostly works behind the scenes and rarely directly battles the Tennysons. At the end of "Perfect Day" he becomes trapped in his own dream machine and is replaced by the Forever King.
Dr. Aloysius James Animo – A promising veterinary scientist whose career was cut short when he was discovered performing twisted genetic experiments on mutating animals. He had hoped that his research would win him the Verties Award. Because of the nature of his research, he lost the award to another doctor named Kelly. This drove him insane, and he dropped off the map for five years until he could perfect his research. After being defeated by Ben for the first time, Dr. Animo makes himself a personal nemesis to the boy, always hoping to defeat him and rule the world. His powers include controlling mutant animals, reviving them and creating them. He is Ben's tertiary archenemy. 
Hex – A self-proclaimed master magician and sorcerer from the inter-dimensional world of Ledgerdomain. 
Charmcaster – Hex's gifted 15-year-old niece, who at first appears loyal to her uncle but was actually using him to get power for herself. She later attempts to use a spell to swap bodies with Ben in order to gain possession of the Omnitrix only to switch with Gwen by mistake and be foiled, and have her spell book stolen by Gwen. She later becomes a member of the Negative 10 to get revenge on the Tennysons, though her grudge is mainly against Gwen. Her powers include mana manipulation and spellcasting. She is Gwen's archenemy.

Voice cast

Main 
Tara Strong  Ben Tennyson, Upgrade, Blitzwolfer, Buzzshock, Gwendolyn Tennyson (future), Mrs. Fang, Edith, Lucy Mann, Ken Tennyson, Sandra Tennyson
 Meagan Smith  Gwen Tennyson
Paul Eiding  Max "Grandpa Max" Tennyson
Steve Blum  Vilgax, Heatblast, Ripjaws, Ghostfreak, Four Arms (4-year-old), Heat Jaws (fusion of Heatblast & Ripjaws), Zs'Skayr, Mr. Mann, Roger, Edward White, Steve Cummings, Bob
Dee Bradley Baker Wildmutt, Stinkfly, Eye Guy, Spitter, Stink Arms (fusion of Stinkfly & Four Arms), Carl Tennyson, Huge Limax, Mutant Frog, Mutant Cockatiel, Joe, Acid Breath, Stone Creatures, SixSix, Porcupine, Immovable Object, Mr. Zu, Interpreter Alien, Drones, Elsgood (Old), Joel Tennyson, Camille's Ex-Boyfriend, Scooter (in "A Change of Face"), Amazing Alan
Jim Ward  Diamondhead, XLR8, Wildvine, Diamond Matter (Fusion of Diamondhead & Grey Matter), Gordon Tennyson, Captain Shaw, Jack, Hotel Guard, Mr. Beck, S.A.M.
Richard Steven Horvitz  Grey Matter, Sublimino, Billy, Arnold
Richard McGonagle  Four Arms, Dr. Kelly, Exo-Skull, President, Scooter (in "Hijacked")
Fred Tatasciore  Ripjaws, Cannonbolt, Way Big, Ben 10,000, Duane, Krakken, Mycelium, Bug-Lite, Coach Finn, Scooter (in "The Return"), Dr. Doomacus

Additional

Episodes

Production

Development
Ben 10 was created by "Man of Action" and was produced by Cartoon Network Studios. Man of Action is a group consisting of comic book creators Duncan Rouleau, Joe Casey, Joe Kelly, and Steven T. Seagle. The group worked on Ben 10's concept roughly 3 years before Cartoon Network picked up the series. Dave Johnson also helped in the design development.

Early on in development, it was decided that a villain would be within the Omnitrix. After Ghostfreak was created the creators added dialogue into the first season to give the audience that there is something more to Ghostfreak. Originally Cannonbolt the 11th alien transformation in the series, was going to be in the original set of aliens, but was replaced with Ghostfreak.

When doing test animations for the series the first alien transformation to be tested was Four Arms. It was the most popular transformation out of all the aliens for "Man of Action". Many of the unused designs for Upchuck were recycled in the episode "Ben 10,000" as two of Ben's aliens "Spitter" and "Articguana", and as villain Sploot.

Steven E. Gordon worked on an early version of the show. His concept work reveals that Ben Tennyson was originally going to be a red-headed young boy. Gordon also has early designs of the Omnitrix which look more like a watch than the final version, as well as different designs and names for the alien transformations. Some of the early names for the transformations were "StrongGuy", "Inferno", "RazorJaws", "Dragonfly", "Plantguy", and "Digger". Some of the early designs for the aliens are more human and superheroic, similar to Dial H for Hero.

Sunmin Image Pictures, Dong Woo Animation and Lotto Animation, Inc. contributed some of the animation for this series.

Theme song
The theme song for the series was written by Andy Sturmer and sung by Mz. Moxy. The main title were created by Renegade Animation, who was well known for Hi Hi Puffy AmiYumi, which was created by Ben 10'''s executive producer Sam Register. The flash animated sequence during the main title was designed to let the audience know that the show is going to be fun and not just an action show. The opening credits were altered in the third season and beyond to reflect that Ghostfreak was no longer to be used, and was replaced by Cannonbolt as the ninth alien.

Casting
Kris Zimmerman was in charge of casting and was the voice director. Tara Strong voices the title character Ben Tennyson, Upgrade, Benwolf, Lucy Mann-Tennyson, Ken Tennyson, and Sandra Tennyson. She also voices Future Gwen and Buzzshock in "Ben 10,000". Meagan Smith voices Ben's cousin Gwen Tennyson, and Paul Eiding voices Grandpa Max and his version of Upgrade.

Steven Blum voices Ben's alien transformations Heatblast and Ghostfreak, as well as the series' main villain Vilgax. Dee Bradley Baker voices Ben's transformations Stinkfly, Eye Guy, and Wildmutt, Baker also voices Ben's school bully/friend Cash Murray, and many of his enemies such as The Limax, SixSix, Acid Breath, and the character Elsgood. Baker is also notable for voicing various characters and aliens. Richard Steven Horvitz voices Ben's Grey Matter transformation and the villain Sublimino. Richard McGonagle voices Ben's Four Arms transformation, and the villain Exo-Skull. Fred Tatasciore voices Ben's aliens Ripjaws, Cannonbolt, and Way Big, Tatasciore also voices a future version of Ben in "Ben 10,000". And Jim Ward voices the transformations Diamondhead, XLR8, and Wildvine, and the character Gordon Tennyson.

Films, sequels, and spin-offs
TV films
Two Ben 10 films have been released at different times during 2007 and 2008. The first is a regular animated feature called Secret of the Omnitrix, in which the Omnitrix is accidentally set to self-destruct and Ben must track down its creator to stop it. A trailer of the film was released with the film Billy & Mandy: Wrath of the Spider Queen, and it aired August 10, 2007. Michael Ouweleen described the film's villain, which was actually Vilgax, as "like Darth Vader without the sense of humor." A different version of Secrets of the Omnitrix, which introduced a different alien (Eye Guy) to the one in the original (Heatblast), aired on September 1, 2007. A third version (in which XLR8 was featured) aired on October 20, 2007. It was stated during the premiere of Alien Force that Secret of the Omnitrix was intended to be the chronological finale of Ben 10, even though it was broadcast long before the last episode, which was not canon.

A CGI movie titled Ben 10: Destroy All Aliens was first released on March 11, 2012, in Asia and on March 23, 2012 in the US. The movie focuses on a 10-year-old Ben returning to school after the summer.http://www.toonzone.net/news/articles/38225/sdcc2011-ben-10-destroy-all-aliens-trailer-released The movie was released in 2 different versions on Asia. The Filipino viewers heard the Philippine winners while the rest of Southeast Asia heard the Malaysian kids.Ben 10: Race Against Time is the first film in the series. It revolves around Ben (Graham Phillips), Gwen (Haley Ramm) and Grandpa Max (Lee Majors) returning to their hometown of Bellwood and attempting to adjust to being ‘normal’ again. Unfortunately, their lives are once again disrupted by a mysterious alien known as Eon (Christien Anholt), who has an unexpected connection to the Omnitrix.

Sequel seriesBen 10: Alien Force is the sequel to the show set five years after the original series. As an indirect result, this series is darker in tone compared to its predecessor. The series premiered on Cartoon Network on April 18, 2008, and ended on March 26, 2010. It has since been premiered in Canada, on Teletoon. A video game of the show is now out for the Nintendo DS, Wii, PlayStation 2 and PlayStation Portable.

Another sequel series, Ben 10: Ultimate Alien, premiered on April 23, 2010, and takes place 3–4 weeks after the finale of Alien Force.

Protector of EarthBen 10: Protector of Earth is the first Ben 10 video game, released in autumn 2007.

Following the success of the Ben 10 animated TV series and films, various Ben 10 merchandise has been released for general sale. These items include Ben 10 books, action figures, card games such as Top Trumps, toys, video games – notably Ben 10: Protector of Earth, bedding, and footwear.

FusionFall

Ben 10 appears in Cartoon Network's online MMO FusionFall. The character design for Ben Tennyson was changed when the original Ben 10 series ended and was replaced by Ben 10: Alien Force''. In the game, he serves as a "Player Guide" offering guide-based missions and special items that can only be used with certain guides.

References

External links

Official Ben 10 US site
Official Ben 10 AU site
Official Ben 10 UK site

Inside the World of Ben 10 – Event with creator Tramm Wigzell at BAFTA

Ben 10 television series
2000s American animated television series
2000s American science fiction television series
2005 American television series debuts
2008 American television series endings
American children's animated action television series
American children's animated adventure television series
American children's animated science fantasy television series
American children's animated superhero television series
Animated television series about children
Cartoon Network original programming
Television series by Cartoon Network Studios
Cartoon Network Studios superheroes
Child superheroes
English-language television shows
Anime-influenced Western animated television series
Television series about shapeshifting
Toonami